The 2011–12 3. Liga was the fourth season of the 3. Liga, Germany's third tier of its football league system. The season commenced on 22 July 2011, two weeks earlier than the 2011–12 Bundesliga season and one week after the 2011–12 2. Bundesliga season, and ended with the last games on 5 May 2012. The traditional winter break was held between the weekends around 18 December 2011 and 22 January 2012.

The league comprises fourteen teams from the 2010–11 season, the last two teams from the 2010–11 2. Bundesliga, the losers of the promotion play-off between the 16th-placed 2. Bundesliga team and the third-placed 3. Liga team as well as the three champions of the three 2010–11 Regionalliga divisions.

Teams
Eintracht Braunschweig as 2010–11 champions and runners-up Hansa Rostock were directly promoted to the 2011–12 2. Bundesliga. Braunschweig, who were a member of the league since the inaugural season, will return to the 2. Bundesliga after a total of four seasons in the third tier of the German football pyramid, while Rostock only had a cameo appearance in the league.

The two promoted teams will be replaced by the two worst-placed teams of the 2010–11 2. Bundesliga season, Rot-Weiß Oberhausen and Arminia Bielefeld. Pending license approvals (see below), both clubs will make their debut in the league; Oberhausen will drop to the third level after three years, while Arminia will return to the third tier after sixteen seasons.

On the other end of the table, Bayern Munich II were relegated to their respective 2011–12 Fußball-Regionalliga divisions after finishing the 2010–11 season at the bottom of the table, thus ending a run which saw them being part of a German third-tier league since 1973. Wacker Burghausen and Werder Bremen II, who were originally going to be relegated as well, were eventually spared as Rot Weiss Ahlen and TuS Koblenz would not enter the league for the 2011–12 season. Ahlen were automatically demoted after the club had to file for administration after the completion of the 2010–11 season, while Koblenz voluntarily withdrew their participation following being unable to generate an adequate budget for the season.

The three relegated teams will be replaced by the champions of the three 2010–11 Regionalliga divisions, Chemnitzer FC, SV Darmstadt 98 and SC Preußen Münster. All three clubs will make their debuts in the 3. Liga, but nevertheless have played in a third-tier league before. Both Regionalliga Nord champions Chemnitz and Regionalliga West winners Preußen Münster returned to this level after an absence of five seasons, while Darmstadt 98 completed a four-year tenure at the fourth tier.

A further spot in the league was contested in a two-legged relegation/promotion playoff between the 16th-placed team of the 2010–11 2. Bundesliga, VfL Osnabrück, and the third-placed team of the 2010–11 3. Liga, Dynamo Dresden. Dynamo won 4–2 on aggregate and thus returned to the 2. Bundesliga after a five-year absence, while Osnabrück, 3. Liga champions in 2009–10, immediately returned to the 3. Liga, having lost their second relegation/promotion playoff series in three years. This will be the first time a previous champion has played in the 3. Liga.

Stadia and locations

Notes
1 Stadion am Bieberer Berg is being rebuilt during the 2011–12 season, resulting in a significantly reduced capacity during this time.

Personnel and sponsorships

Managerial changes

League table

Results

Top goalscorers
Source: kicker (German)Including matches played on 5 May 201217 goals
  Marcel Reichwein (Rot-Weiß Erfurt)14 goals
  Robert Lechleiter (VfR Aalen)  Tobias Schweinsteiger (Jahn Regensburg)13 goals
  Sebastian Glasner (Wacker Burghausen)  Frank Löning (SV Sandhausen)  Dominik Stroh-Engel (SV Babelsberg 03)12 goals
  Zlatko Janjić (SV Wehen Wiesbaden)  Markus Müller (SV Babelsberg 03)11 goals
  Marius Laux (1. FC Saarbrücken)  Marc Schnatterer (1. FC Heidenheim)  Mijo Tunjić (SpVgg Unterhaching)  Marcel Ziemer (1. FC Saarbrücken)''

Player awards
The following players were named as player of the month throughout the season. Fabian Klos won the player of the year award after a poll.

 August:  Tobias Schweinsteiger (SpVgg Unterhaching)
 September:  Tobias Schweinsteiger (SpVgg Unterhaching)
 October:  Niclas Füllkrug (Werder Bremen II)
 November:  Johannes Rahn (Arminia Bielefeld)
 December:  Fabian Klos (Arminia Bielefeld)
 February:  Anton Fink (Chemnitzer FC)
 March:  Marcel Reichwein (Rot-Weiss Erfurt)
 April:  Marc Schnatterer (1. FC Heidenheim)

References

External links
 3rd Liga on DFB page 

2011-12
3
Ger